Escape from New York Pizza (EFNY) is a pizzeria in Portland, Oregon.

Description

Escape from New York Pizza (EFNY) is a pizzeria serving New York-style pizza on 23rd Avenue in northwest Portland's Northwest District. The interior features a narrow counter, and there are two outdoor tables, as of 2021. Cheese and pepperoni pizza by the slice are served on paper plates.

History
EFNY was established in 1983. Prior to relocating to Northwest 23rd Avenue, the pizzeria operated "just below" 10th Avenue in downtown Portland. According to Byron Beck of Eater Portland, "EFNYP was the first very place in Portland where you could buy pizza by the slice: authentic New York-style, thin-crust pizza that was easy to fold and cheap on the wallet." Phil Geffner is the owner.

The pizzeria began accepting credit and debit cards in 2013. According to Sara Hottman of The Oregonian, Geffner "refused to serve salads, provide ranch dressing or delivery, or take credit or debit cards for just more than 30 years." For the business's 35th anniversary, free pizza slices were given to guests in June 2018.

Reception

In 2013 and 2018, Michael Russell ranked EFNY number three and number four, respectively, in The Oregonian lists of Portland's best pizza by the slice. He described EFNY as "the elder statesman of local pie-slingers" and said, the cheese slice "is large enough to hang well off the edges of a paper plate, floppy with a hint of crunch, with salty mozzarella and spicy sauce, always served hot enough that a bite taken within the time it takes to walk four blocks will land you in the burn ward at Legacy Good Samaritan Medical Center."

Willamette Week included EFNYs pepperoni slice in a 2018 list of "Eight Great Single-Serve Pizzas and Slices in Portland". The newspaper said EFNY "has been here so long it has, indeed, escaped New York: Getting a pepperoni slice with long-proofed dough, sweet red sauce and generous mozzarella has become Portland's greatest and longest-running pizza tradition—as has getting ribbed a bit by owner Phil Geffner when you come in." In his 2018 quest to find Portland's best pizza by the slice, the Portland Mercury Chad Walsh wrote: 

Alex Frane included EFNY in Thrillist's 2020 overview of "The Absolute Best Pizza in Portland", writing, "Fact: Escape has the most authentic New York slices in the city... Escape From New York has been serving its reheated slices of pepperoni and cheese pizzas out of its narrow, dingy space since 1983 to an unending audience, and for that, we've gotta give it up." Nathan Williams included EFNY in Eater Portland 2021 overview of "Where to Grab Pizza by the Slice in and Around Portland". He wrote, "The cheese vs. sauce needle here is tipped heavily towards the mozzarella end of the scale, making an Escape From New York a sound end-of-night counter-balance to that last drink you had at the bar. Unlike newer spots that strain to achieve the patina of an old-school pizza parlor, EFNY is the real deal, complete with service that is more New York-brusque than Portland-passive."

See also

 Pizza in Portland, Oregon

References

External links

 
 Escape from New York Pizza at Frommer's
 Escape from New York Pizza at Zomato

1983 establishments in Oregon
Northwest Portland, Oregon
Pizzerias in Portland, Oregon
Restaurants established in 1983